Pure Nintendo Magazine (PNM) is a bi-monthly, independently published magazine that features Nintendo-related content and news. The print's first issue of PNM was published in October 2011 by Pure Media, LLC. The magazine joined Metacritic in 2019 with its consistent stream of first-party and third-party video game reviews. Currently, issues of the magazine are released digitally, though physical copies can be purchased.

Overview 

PNM focuses on content such as developer interviews, game previews, concept and fan artwork, game tips, interactive puzzles, and gaming history. This content is supplemented with news, reviews, and other game information. Each issue has regularly featured content as well as additional features written by either Pure Nintendo staff members or contributors.

History 

Founder Justin Sharp created the website, Niwifi.net, in 2007 for users to exchange friend codes (a 12-digit code that allowed users of Nintendo's online service to find and connect with each other). Soon after, Justin Sharp teamed up with James Higginbotham, and the website eventually turned its focus towards Nintendo-related news.

PNM, as it is known now, was founded by Justin Sharp and James Higginbotham and first published October 2011. The magazine was initially conceptualized as a monthly publication. PNM switched to a bi-monthly publication schedule beginning with the February 2012 issue. The first 5 issues of PNM were offered in a digital-only format. The sixth issue of PNM was the first print issue and was published August 2012 for the months of August and September 2012. Early issues of PNM were small and only 26 pages by Issue 5. Issue 6 of PNM more than doubled in size and was 62 pages long.

On September 11, 2012, Pure Nintendo launched a Kickstarter campaign to help fund the magazine and start a subscription service. The Kickstarter funding goal was set at $20,000 and Pure Nintendo reached said goal on October 12, 2012 after raising $22,386 in funds. The subscription service for the magazine began with the seventh issue for October and November 2012.

On January 24, 2013, Pure Media LLC., with the help of Ben Stitzer, released an app on Google Play to facilitate an interactive digital version of PNM. On February 8, 2013, Pure Media, LLC., with the help of Ben Stitzer, released an iOS app on the Apple AppStore to enable the interactive digital version to function on iOS devices.

PNM was included in the May 2013 Loot Crate, a subscription box service, which featured the theme "Equip."

Name Change to 'PNM' 

Starting with Issue 10 (April/May 2013) of Pure Nintendo Magazine, the design of the magazine was updated and the name was shortened to "PNM," which stands for Pure Nintendo Magazine, instead of Pure Nintendo. This was partly inspired by the change in design but was also influenced by Nintendo.

Shift To Digital Only Format 

As of June 2014, Pure Nintendo officially announced that they have discontinued print subscriptions. PNM is still available in digital format. Individual print issues are still available for purchase even though print subscriptions are no longer available.

Logo 

The PNM logo has gone through four iterations:

 1.0 - The first version of the P-Wing logo was inspired from the P-Wing in Super Mario Bros. 3.
 2.0 - The next version of the logo departed in style from the 8-bit original. It had contract issues on dark backgrounds.
 3.0 - The third iteration of the P-Wing logo was produced to fix the contrast issues on dark backgrounds. The font for the P was also updated to match the font used for "Pure Nintendo" on the website.
 4.0 - The current form of the P-Wing logo is a slight change from the 3.0 version that reduced the outer border and revised the font to match the one used in Pure Nintendo Magazine.

Current Features

Fan Art Gallery 

The Fan Art Gallery is devoted to user submitted Nintendo fan art. Fan art pieces featured in the Fan Art Gallery include paintings, pencil drawings, digital art, crafts, baked goods, and Miiverse art. Fan art is curated by Kaelyn Daugherty and initially appeared in sporadic issues of PNM but has featured regularly since the October/November 2013 Issue 13 of PNM.

The Question Block 

In the Question Block, PNM features correspondence sent in by the readers with replies from the staff. This section of PNM was first published in June/July 2014 Issue 17.

Character Profile 

The Character Profile features the history of Nintendo characters. Character Profiles feature main characters as well as bosses, enemies, and obscure, lesser known characters. The Character Profile has been a staple feature article in PNM since the first issues of the magazine.

Team Notion Developer Diary 

The Team Notion Developer Diary is a section of PNM that chronicled the development of the indie game title Team Notion for Wii U by Notion Games, written by Andrew Augustin, founder of Notion Games. The first Team Notion Developer Diary was featured in the April/May 2014 Issue 16 of PNM.

Indie Spotlight 

The Indie Spotlight is a section of PNM that highlights an independent game developer. The Indie Spotlight first appeared in June/July 2014 Issue 17.

Let's Talk 

Let's Talk features short opinion pieces from the Pure Nintendo staff. Topics typically revolve around gaming and occasionally touch on Nintendo specific subjects. Beginning with the October/November 2013 issue of PNM, Pure Nintendo has invited a guest game developer to contribute their thoughts on the Let's Talk subject for each issue. The first PNM Let's Talk appeared in the April/May 2012 Issue 5 and became a regular PNM feature beginning the February/March 2013 Issue 9.

Reviews 

The Review section of PNM is a collection of score based reviews on popular recent releases for Nintendo consoles. PNM uses a 10-point scoring system for their reviews.

Pixel Puzzles 

Three Pixel Puzzles are featured in each issue and are solved by filling in the appropriate amount of squares with the corresponding color. After the puzzles are complete, the reader is left with a depiction of a colored in sprite of a Nintendo related object or character.

Upcoming Releases 

The Upcoming Releases section relays information about upcoming releases for Nintendo consoles.

Top News 

The Top News section features Nintendo gaming news topics from the two months prior to the magazine's release.

Intermittent

Gear Review 

The Gear Review section of PNM is a score based review of a product. Products in the PNM Gear Review may not necessarily be Nintendo-related. PNM uses a 10-point scoring system for their reviews.

Retro Review 

The Retro Review is a retrospective of a game from Nintendo's catalog of past titles.

Recipe 

The Recipe features are a how-to guide to creating gaming-inspired food. These recipes first appeared in the February/March Issue 15. Recipes have included rice crispy treat 'bombs' from The Legend of Zelda, Professor Layton Hint Coin cookies, Kingdom Hearts Sea Salt Ice Cream, and a cake from Donkey Kong Country: Tropical Freeze.

Culture Corner 

Culture Corner is a series of articles written by a YouTube gamer, Gaijin Goomba, who was featured in the YouTube Gamer article in PNM Issue 15 for February/March 2014. Culture Corner focuses on the cultural influences on gaming, game franchises, and even particular aspects of specific games. Culture Corner first appeared in the 17th issue of PNM for June/July 2014.

Animal Crossing Corner 

As of April 2020 and the release of Animal Crossing: New Horizons for the Nintendo Switch, PNM revived the recurring spread to discuss tips, tricks and monthly gets from the newest addition of the Animal Crossing franchise. 

Previously, this was known as "Getting To Know Animal Crossing" feature, which provided information about the game Animal Crossing: New Leaf for the 3DS. This section of PNM first appeared in the magazine beginning with the August/September 2013 Issue 12. The last Getting to Know Animal Crossing feature appeared in the April/May 2014 Issue 16.

Retired

Game Music 

The Game Music feature delves into the music in Nintendo games. Game Music sometimes features interviews with the composers and creators of game music compositions. The Game Music feature first appeared in the August/September 2013 Issue 12 of PNM. The Game Music articles last appeared in June/July 2014 Issue 17.

YouTube Gamers 

The YouTube Gamers features an interview with a gamer from video hosting service YouTube. The YouTube Gamers feature first appeared in the October/November 2013 Issue 13 of PNM. The last issue to feature YouTube Gamers was June/July 2014 Issue 17.

Linking You To The Past 

The Linking You To The Past (LYTTP) feature focuses on topics from Nintendo's past. Linking You To The Past first appeared in the December 2012/January 2013 Issue 8 of PNM. The last LYTTP feature was published in October/November 2014 Issue 19.

References

External links 
 Pure Nintendo Official Website

Bimonthly magazines published in the United States
Computer magazines published in the United States
Video game magazines published in the United States
Magazines established in 2011
Magazines about Nintendo
Nintendo publications